The King's College London Faculty of Arts & Humanities is one of the nine academic Faculties of Study of King's College London. It is situated on the Strand in the heart of central London, in the vicinity of many renowned cultural institutions with which the Faculty has close links including the British Museum, Shakespeare's Globe, the National Portrait Gallery and the British Library. , the Times Higher Education comparison of world-class universities ranked it amongst the top twenty arts and humanities faculties in the world.

The Faculty of Arts & Humanities offers study at undergraduate and graduate level in a wide range of subject areas. Many of the departments and programmes offer joint undergraduate degrees, including some with the Departments of Geography and War Studies, in the Faculty of Social Science & Public Policy and with Mathematics in the Faculty of Natural & Mathematical Sciences. As a member of the Russell Group and the Golden triangle, the Faculty receives a high number of applications.

A highlight of the academic calendar is the Faculty's Arts & Humanities Festival when, as one of Britain's pre-eminent centres of research in the Arts and Humanities, the Faculty opens its doors for a fortnight of debate and exploration about a topic and its reverberation in a range of cultural forms, from fiction and theatre to art. The Festival includes a series of lectures by King's academics, exhibitions, round-table discussions and workshops.

The Faculty is a member of The Council of University Deans of Arts, Social Sciences and Humanities (DASSH UK), and of London Citizens. The current Executive Dean of Faculty is Professor Marion Thain, who took over from Professor Russell Goulbourne in December 2018.

History 
Departments like English and German are among England's oldest and were founded in the 19th century. King's College London's Faculty of Arts merged with the Faculties of Music and Theology as the School of Humanities in the late 1980s and took on the name of the School of Arts & Humanities in 2009. The original Arts departments such as War Studies and Geography formed part of the School of Social Science & Public Policy in 2001, while the Arts & Humanities expanded from its 'classical' humanities roots. Over the past few years, the School has established interdisciplinary programmes such as Comparative Literature and a new BA in Liberal Arts launched in 2012. It has led new developments in teaching and research, for instance through the Department of Digital Humanities, Department of Culture, Media & Creative Industries, and the Modern Language Centre. The School of Arts & Humanities became the Faculty of Arts & Humanities in 2014.

Departments

The following departments and centres can be found in the Faculty of Arts & Humanities:

 Classics
 Culture, Media & Creative Industries
 Digital Humanities
 English
 Film Studies
 History
 Languages, Literatures and Cultures
 Liberal Arts
 King's Digital Lab
 Music
 Philosophy
 Theology & Religious Studies

Research Centres include: 

 Centre for Hellenic Studies (incorporating Byzantine & Modern Greek Studies)

 Camões Centre for Portuguese Language & Culture
 Centre for Enlightenment Studies @ King's
 Centre for Hellenic Studies
 Centre for the Humanities & Health
 Centre for Late Antique & Medieval Studies
 Centre for Language Acts and World Making
 Centre for Life Writing
 Centre for Modern Literature and Culture
 Centre for Philosophy and Visual Culture
 Shakespeare Centre London
 Queer@King’s

 Centre for Language, Discourse and Communication (with the Faculty of Social Science and Public Policy)

Notable people

Current academic staff 
 Roderick Beaton, Koraes Professor of Modern Greek & Byzantine History, Language & Literature
 George Benjamin, Henry Purcell Professor of Composition
 Francisco Bethencourt, Charles Boxer Professor 
 Catherine Boyle, Professor of Latin American Cultural Studies
 David Carpenter, Professor of Medieval History
 Richard Drayton, Rhodes Professor of Imperial History
 Richard Dyer, Professor of Film Studies
 Simon Gaunt, Professor of French Literature
 Paul Gilroy, Professor of American & English Literature
 Edith Hall, Professor of Classics
 Brian Hurwitz, D'Oyly Carte Professor of Medicine & the Arts
 Paul Joyce, Samuel Davidson Professor of Old Testament/Hebrew Bible
 Roger Parker, Thurston Dart Professor of Music
 Martin Stokes, King Edward Professor of Music
 Joan E. Taylor, Professor of Christian Origins and Second Temple Judaism
 Patrick Wright, Professor of Literature and Visual & Material Culture

Former academic staff 
 Harrison Birtwistle, British contemporary composer
 Averil Cameron, Warden of Keble College, Oxford, Professor of Late Antique and Byzantine History in the University of Oxford, and Pro-Vice-Chancellor of the University of Oxford
 A. G. Dickens (1910-2001), historian, former Director of the Institute of Historical Research
 John Eliot Gardiner, English conductor
 John Elliott, historian
 F. J. C. Hearnshaw (1869-1946), historian
 Judith Herrin, Emeritus Professor of Late Antique and Byzantine Studies
Efraim Karsh, Founding Director and Emeritus Professor of Middle East and Mediterranean Studies
 Mario Vargas Llosa, Peruvian writer, politician, journalist, essayist, and Nobel Prize laureate
 P. J. Marshall, Emeritus Rhodes Professor of Imperial History, President of the Royal Historical Society from 1997-2001
 Janet Nelson, Emeritus Professor of Medieval History, President of the Royal Historical Society from 2001 to 2005
 Richard Overy, historian
 Curtis Price, Warden of New College, Oxford
 David Profumo, an English novelist, 6th Baron Profumo
 Conrad Russell, 5th Earl Russell (1937-2004), 5th Earl Russell
 Richard Sorabji, Emeritus Professor of Philosophy
 Susan Stebbing (1885-1943), Lecturer in Philosophy

Deans of Faculty 
 Barry Ife (Spanish): August 1989 - July 1997
 Linda Newson (Geography): August 1997 - July 2000
 Michael Knibb (Theology): August 2000 - July 2001
 David Ricks (CHS/CompLit): August 2001 - July 2004
 Ann Thompson (English): August 2004 - December 2007
 Jan Palmowski (German): January 2008 - December 2012
 Simon Gaunt (French): January 2013 - December 2013
 Russell Goulbourne (French): January 2014 - August 2018
 Jo Malt (French): September 2018 - December 2018 (Interim)
 Marion Thain (English): December 2018 -

Notable alumni

Summer School 
The Faculty also offers well recognised Summer School courses as part of the King's College London Summer School. Courses are intensive and use the Faculty’s links with external cultural institutions and make 'London a classroom’.  Courses on offer showcase work done in research centres such as Queer@Kings or the Centre for Humanities & Health.

Publications 
Many academic staff at King's are editors and contributors to many standard editions such as the Arden Shakespeare series. 
The Faculty of Arts & Humanities houses several publication series, from monographs produced in conjunction with other publishing houses such as Ashgate to small in-house series.

The current list of series includes
 Modern Poetry in Translation (Second Series)
 Plain Text Series
 Centre for Hellenic Studies Publications
 Institute of Advanced Musical Studies: Study Texts
 Adam Archive Publications
 Centre for Twentieth-Century Studies Publications
 King’s College London Medieval Series
 King’s College London Hispanic Series
 Office for Humanities Communication Series
 Mediterranean Studies Monographs

References

External links 
 King's College London Faculty of Arts & Humanities homepage
 Arts & Humanities Festival website
 King's College London Summer School homepage
 The Council of University Deans of Arts, Social Sciences and Humanities website

Arts and Humanities
Educational institutions established in 1829
1829 establishments in England